The Minister of Justice and Security is the head of the Ministry of Justice and Security and a member of the Cabinet and the Council of Ministers. The current Minister is Dilan Yesilgöz-Zegerius of the People's Party for Freedom and Democracy (VVD) who has been in office since 10 January 2022. Regularly a State Secretary is assigned to the Ministry who is tasked with specific portfolios. The current State Secretary is Eric van der Burg of the People's Party for Freedom and Democracy (VVD) who also has been in office since 10 January 2022 and has been assigned the portfolios of Immigration and Asylum and Integration. Occasionally there is also a Minister without Portfolio assigned to the Ministry who is also giving specific portfolios. The current Minister without Portfolio is Franc Weerwind of the Democrats 66 (D66) party and who also has been in office since 10 January 2022 and has been assigned the portfolios of Public Prosecution, Civil Law, Victims' Rights, Debt and Gambling.

Agents of Justice (1798)

Secretaries of State of Justice (1801–1802)

Directors-General of Justice and Police (1806)

Ministers of Justice and Police (1806–1866)

Ministers of Justice (1866–1945)

Ministers of Justice (1945–present)

List of Ministers without Portfolio

List of State Secretaries for Justice

See also
 Ministry of Justice and Security
 Judiciary of the Netherlands
 Criminal justice system of the Netherlands
 Public Prosecution Office
 Law enforcement in the Netherlands
 National Coordinator for Security and Counterterrorism
 Immigration and Naturalisation Service
 Custodial Institutions Agency

References

Justice